Sham Machandranath Kakade is an American computer scientist. He is a Gordon McKay Professor in Computer Science at Harvard University, with a joint appointment in the Department of Statistics. He co-founded the Algorithmic Foundations of Data Science Institute.

Kakade's research includes work on Reinforcement Learning, Tensor-Algebraic methods, and Convex optimization.

Kakade earned a bachelor's degree from Caltech and a PhD from the Gatsby Computational Neuroscience Unit at University College London. He has also served as a Principal Researcher at Microsoft Research, an assistant professor at the Toyota Technological Institute at Chicago and Wharton, and a professor at the University of Washington.

References

External links 
 Sham Kakade's home page
 MusicNet

American computer scientists
Harvard University faculty
Alumni of University College London
California Institute of Technology alumni
Year of birth missing (living people)
Living people